Sir Malcolm Rognvald Innes of Edingight  (25 May 1938 – 20 September 2020) was Lord Lyon King of Arms of Scotland from 1981 until 2001.

Early life
He was the son of Sir Thomas Innes of Learney (Lord Lyon from 1945 to 1969) and Lady Lucy Buchan, daughter of Norman Macleod Sinclair, 18th Earl of Caithness. He was educated at Edinburgh Academy and at the University of Edinburgh where he studied law.

Career
He was appointed a Writer to the Signet in 1964. His first heraldic appointment was as Falkland Pursuivant of Arms Extraordinary from 1957 to 1958, then as Carrick Pursuivant of Arms in Ordinary from 1958 to 1971 and as Marchmont Herald of Arms in Ordinary from 1971–81.

He was Lyon Clerk and Keeper of the Records from 1966 to 1981. He was Lord Lyon King of Arms from 1981–2001, also holding the office of Secretary to the Order of the Thistle for the same period.

Following his retirement in 2001, he was appointed Orkney Herald of Arms Extraordinary.  He was also a Fellow, former president, and co-founder of the Heraldry Society of Scotland, as well as being Honorary President of the Scottish Genealogy Society until 19 February 2007, when he retired after many years in that position.

Innes of Edingight was appointed a CVO in 1981 and promoted to KCVO in 1990. He has been a member of the Royal Company of Archers since 1971, and was a Grand Officer of Merit of the Sovereign Military Order of Malta. 

He died in September 2020 at the age of 82 from cancer.

Arms

See also
Heraldry
Pursuivant
Herald
King of Arms

References

 

1938 births
2020 deaths
People educated at Edinburgh Academy
Alumni of the University of Edinburgh
Lord Lyon Kings of Arms
Knights Commander of the Royal Victorian Order
Members of the Royal Company of Archers
Fellows of the Society of Antiquaries of Scotland
Deaths from cancer in the United Kingdom